3776 (pronounced Minanaro) is a Japanese idol group themed after Mount Fuji, Japan's tallest mountain.  The name is derived from the height of the mountain: 3,776 meters.

The group has received critical acclaim for their musicianship and DIY ethos.

History

TEAM MII
Inspired by AKB48, Akira Ishida - who would later become the producer of 3776 - decided to launch a local idol group. Ishida sent e-mails to city offices all over Japan. One of the cities he included in his letters was Fujinomiya, a city in Shizuoka prefecture. A city official in Fujinomiya, which was celebrating its 60th anniversary, had already been considering creating an idol group under the project name Waga Machi no AKB (Our town's AKB) in commemoration of the town when he received Ishida's letter. Upon receiving the letter he requested a demo of Ishida's music. After hearing the demo he promptly requested that Ishida become the producer of his idol group. Auditions were held to determine the group's lineup: Waga Machi no AKB audition participants were judged on dancing to a song by AKB48. After the audition 24 members were selected to make up the group, which Ishida named TEAM MII after NMB48's Team M.
 
TEAM MII debuted on June 2, 2012, with the debut song "Yappari Kimi wa Sousa Bacchirisa". Because it was created by the city office, many limitations were placed on the group. They were allowed to perform only in Fujinomiya City, and weren't allowed to sell any goods or CDs. From the beginning their contract was only for one year, after which they were to disband.
 
For one year Ishida worked to create 9 songs, 8 of which were performed. The city office stopped Ishida from performing the song "Yuurei Shoutengai" (Ghost Shopping District) since they felt that the song's title and lyrics were inappropriate, and asked Ishida to change the name to "Gambare Shoutengai" (Cheer Up! Shopping District). Because Ishida refused to amend his song, "Yuurei Shoutengai" was not even practiced by the members. The theme of the song is actually satirical and sympathetic to the situation of Fujinomiya's shopping district, which began to decline after the large shopping retailer AEON opened in 2001, forcing many stores in Fujinomiya to close.
 
TEAM MII disbanded on March 24, 2013. 3 EPs, "Yappari Kimi wa Sousa Bacchirisa", "Minna no Fujinomiya Yakisoba", and "Wakatteyo nee Sensei" were released on April 27, 2013, after they had already parted ways.

3776 Season#1
Once their contract was terminated, some of the members desiring to continue the idol group asked Ishida to continue as their producer. In response to their requests Ishida started 3776 on July 22, 2013, when Mt. Fuji was registered as a world heritage site. The group's name was derived from the altitude of Mt. Fuji, 3776 meters. The group consisted of 7 members; Mari Mitsumoto, Seina Hara, Yuika Taki, Rena Mochizuki, Sakura Suzuki, Rina Nakahara, and Hina Saito, all of whom were former TEAM MII members.
 
3776 debuted their first song "Watashi no Sekaiisan" (My World Heritage) at a ceremony held by the Fujinomiya city office celebrating Mt. Fuji's registration as a world heritage site. The song poked fun at people who were carried away with the prestige of Mt Fuji receiving "World Heritage Site" status, promoting the idea that the true value of something is unchangeable whether recognized by an authority or not.
 
Because Seina Hara, Yuika Taki and Rina Nakahara left the group successively, Ishida declared 3776 Season#1 to be over in October.
 
"Watashi no Sekaiisan" was released attributed to 3776 Season#1 on December 22, 2013, despite the fact that season 3776 Season#2 had already begun.

3776 Season#2
On November 2, 2013, Chiyono Ide joined the group. 3776 Season#2 started and on November 4, 2013, Sakura Suzuki left the group. 3776 Season#2 consisted of Rena Mochizuki, Mari Mitsumoto, Hina Saito, and Chiyono Ide. They performed their new songs "Moe Moe Kataomoi" and "Mi ni Kite" on November 2, 2013.In January 2014, Sumire Kondo became a member of 3770 (3776's group to train new talent, becoming the first member to join 3776). She was the first member of 3776 who didn't also formerly belong to Team MII. They released EPs "Jokyoku" and "Shinpai no Tane" on June 22, 2014. Right after the release, Rena Mochizuki and Hina Saito left the group and Mari Mitsumoto also stated that she would leave the group in the near future. Ishida declared 3776 Season#2 to be over and 3776 Season#2+ to have begun on July 30, 2014.

3776Season#2+
Due to the sudden withdrawal of 3776's then most popular member Rena Mochizuki, and Mari Mitsumoto's plan to leave the group, Ishida added trainee Sumire to 3776 and changed 3776 Season#2 to 3776 Season#2+. The members consisted of Mari Mitsumoto, Chiyono Ide and Sumire Kondo (3770).
At first, they planned to recruit new members for 3770 and when 3770 reached 6 members, 3776 Season#4 would start.
 
3776 Season#2+ was active, performing in tandem with 3776 Season#3 until February 2015 when Mari Mitsumoto left the group. New songs for Season#2+ were not created.

3776 Season#3
Further resignations from leading members forced Ishida to start 3776 Season#3 as Chiyono Ide's solo project. 3776 Season#3 started on August 8, 2014. The Season#3 EP "Love Letter" was released on December 28, 2014. Then the online music distribution website OTOTOY started offering "Love Letter" and TEAM MII's "Yappari Kimi wa Sousa Bacchirisa", "Minna no Fujinomiya Yakisoba", and "Wakatteyo nee Sensei" for download, all previously only available on CD. Following this, OTOTOY began to build up many different corporate relationships with 3776, and eventually digitally released all of their previous CDs.
 
On April 26, 2015, Chiyono Ide played their 4 new songs "Haru ga Kita" ,"Hachi Goume nya Mada Hayai" ,"Noboranai Riyuu ga Aru to Sureba", and "3.11" which were defined as being 3776 Season#3.1.A music video for "3.11" was made and edited exclusively by Akira Ishida. The song's theme was the 2011 Great Touhoku earthquake and the tsunami which followed. 3.11 became 3776's most famous song to date.
 
On the day of the debut of 3776 Season#3.1, 3776's official Twitter account released a statement saying that until 3776 Season#3 had accomplished all of the things they could do in a solo style, 3776 Season#3 would continue. As a result, the trainees in 3770 were changed into their own new group, Mi-II (from "Team Minanaro II"), which would cover all of 3776 and TEAM MII's older music.
 
On July 11, 2015, 3776 had their first "one man show" live concert in Tokyo named "Hinan Keikaku to One-man Live" (Plan for evacuation and one man live). At the concert, they started to sell 3.11 as their first single, and Mari Mitsumoto returned as a special guest.
 
On December 12, 2015, they released their full-length album "3776 wo Kikanai Riyuu ga Aru to Sureba" (If there were a reason to not listen to 3776). It received high acclaim from critics and musicians alike and became their first commercially successful CD.
 
Later, in July 2018 they performed this album completely 5 times. Two lives in Fujinomiya City were released as one DVD. One live in Tokyo was released as BD-R.

"Bon to 3776 ga Issho ni Kuruyo" and "Mousugu Koukou Seikatsu"(Chiyono Ide Solo Project)
At their third "one man show" live concert at Shinjuku Loft named "Bon to 3776 ga Issho ni Kuruyo"(Bon festival and 3776 come together), they performed their Top 5 most famous songs as voted on by their fans. During the performance, Chiyono Ide, performing as 3776Season#3 announced to the crowd that a guest would be performing.  She called for the guest to come out and then having changed clothes emerged as the guest as a solo Idol.  She performed 5 songs and afterward announced 3 things.  Firstly, that she would embark on a solo career while continuing to perform with 3776,  secondly, that she would release her debut solo album titled "Mousugu Koukou Seikatsu", and thirdly, that 3776 would hold an audition for 3776Season#4. It was later announced that her album Mousugu-Koukouseikatsu would be released on the music distribution website ototoy.jp on August 22, 2016, and would subsequently be released on CD on  September 28.

3776 Season#4  
In the 4th quarter of 2016 auditions were held for the potential 3776Season#4.  
The end of 3776 Season#3's live concert on January 7, 2017, marked the beginning of a period of hiatus for 3776, taken for the purpose of affording Chiyono Ide the time to sufficiently concentrate on her preparatory studies for high school entrance exams.  
On May 3, 2017, an event will be held in Fujinomiya city at the city cultural center with the dual purpose of officially ending the period of hiatus as well as either marking the beginning of 3776Season#4 or the beginning of 3776 Season#3 Neo depending on whether or not any participants survive the audition process.  (If new members are added after passing auditions it will become 3776Season#4 and if not then it will become 3776 Season#3 Neo.)

On May 3, 2017, 3776 started Season#4 with the addition of a new member, Aina Hirose But she left 3776 on April 8, 2018, and Season#4 has been suspended to date.

3776 Season#3 Neo and 3776 Extended  
Currently, 3776 has two styles, "3776 Season#3 Neo" and "3776 Extended".  
Season#3 Neo is the same as Season#3. 3776 Extended is a style in which Chiyino Ide and producer Akira Ishida play while creating sound.

In addition to them, "Chiyono Ide" solo project continues too.

Discography

Video albums

Filmography 
  (2017)

References

External links
3776 Official Site 
Chiyono Ide Official Site 

Japanese girl groups
Japanese idol groups
Musical groups established in 2013
Japanese pop music groups
2013 establishments in Japan
Child musical groups